This list of snakes of Africa includes all snakes in the continent of Africa.

 Philothamnus natalensis;
 Echis megalocephalus;
 Naja melanoleuca;
 Afrotyphlops gierrai;
 Bitis caudalis;
 Bitis peringueyi;
 Dispholidus typus;
 Spitting cobra (Many species);
 Dendroaspis polylepis;
 Vipera monticola;
 Namibiana rostrata;
 Malpolon moilensis;
Bitis gabonica;
Afrotyphlops schlegelii;
Berg adder;
Amblyodipsas;
Bicoloured blind snake;
Amblyodipsas concolor;
Puff adder;
Amblyodipsas dimidiata;
Bitis heraldica;
Amblyodipsas katangensis;
Bitis nasicornis;
Calabar python;
Damara threadsnake;
Calabresi's blind snake;
Dasypeltis confusa;
Cape cobra;
Dasypeltis scabra;
Cape file snake;
Drewes's worm snake;
Cape wolf snake;
Dwarf water cobra;
Damara threadsnake;
Dasypeltis confusa;
Polemon neuwiedi;
Polemon ater;
Polemon christyi;
Red adder.
Thelotornis kirtlandii

Africa
Snakes